Mehmet Görmez (born 1959) is the former President of the Presidency of Religious Affairs ( from November 2010 to 31 July 2017, commonly known as Diyanet) and as such legally the highest level Islamic scholar in Turkey and the Turkish Republic of Northern Cyprus.

Background
Mehmet Görmez was born in 1959 in Nizip in Gaziantep Province, Turkey. His maternal grandmother was Turkish, while his paternal grandmother was Kurdish. His paternal side is partially from Sivas.

He has been the President of Diyanet since November 2010. In 1987, he completed his studies of Islamic studies at Ankara University and gained his bachelor's degree at this faculty. Later, he became an assistant at Ahmet Yesevi University in Kazakhstan. From 1988 to 1989, he visited Cairo University. In 1995, he earned his PhD in Islamic studies at the Ankara University. From 1997 to 1998, he lived in the United Kingdom. From 2001 to 2003 he gave lessons at the Hacettepe University. He became a professor in 2006. 

The Islamic State in Iraq and the Levant (ISIL) declared him an apostate.

He speaks Turkish, Arabic, English, and partially a regional dialect of Kurdish that is 50 percent Turkish-influenced according to his own account.

References

External links

http://www.diyanet.gov.tr/en

1959 births
Living people
People from Nizip
Academic staff of Hacettepe University
Turkish civil servants
Turkish non-fiction writers
Turkish Sunni Muslim scholars of Islam
Turkish theologians
Presidents of Religious Affairs of Turkey
Academic staff of Ahmet Yesevi University